Agent 13 may refer to:

Agent 13: The Midnight Avenger, a spy fiction series published by TSR from 1986 to 1988, and the name of the main character
Agent 13: The Invisible Empire (1986), the first book in the series
Agent 13: The Serpentine Assassin (1986), the second book in the series
Fury/Agent 13 (1998), a comic book miniseries published by Marvel Comics
Agent 13 (comics) or Sharon Carter, a character in the series
Agent 13, a supporting character in the spy parody TV series Get Smart
 Agent K-13/Fang, a poorly trained CONTROL dog in the 1960s television series Get Smart